Conus mcbridei is a species of sea snail, a marine gastropod mollusk in the family Conidae, the cone snails and their allies.

Like all species within the genus Conus, these snails are predatory and venomous. They are capable of "stinging" humans, therefore live ones should be handled carefully or not at all.

Description
The size of the shell varies between 8.5 mm and 11 mm.

Distribution
This marine species occurs off the Philippines, Maldives and Hawaii.

References

External links
 The Conus Biodiversity website
 Cone Shells - Knights of the Sea
 

mcbridei
Gastropods described in 2005